Christensen & Co (CCO) is an architectural firm based in Copenhagen, Denmark. It was founded in 2006 by Michael Christensen and is particularly known for its work in sustainable architecture, often with the educational sector.

History
Christensen & Co was established in 2006 by architect Michael Christensen who came from a position as partner and managing creative director in Henning Larsen Architects. Only a few months later the firm won a competition for the design of a campus for the Royal Institute of Technology in Stockholm, Sweden. The winning entry had a high environmental profile with an energy consumption only a third of what is normal in similar buildings. Since then firm has won a number of international architectural competitions, including a 70,000 m² research and educational centre at the Karolinska Institute in southern Stockholm (2008), a sustainable masterplan for a new district in the Dutch city Almere (2009) and a new city hall in Lund, Sweden (2010). Christensen & Co has also designed Denmark's first public CO2-neutral building, a faculty building designed for the Faculty of Science at the University of Copenhagen.

Organisation
In 2016, Vibeke Lydolph Lindblad, Michael Werin Larsen, Mikkel Hermann Sørensen og Thomas Nørgaard joined Michael Christensen as partners of Christensen & Co. Vibeke Lydolph Lindblad was appointed to CEO while Michael Christensen still holds the position as creative director.

Selected projects
 Campus building, Royal Institute of Technology, Stockholm, Sweden (u/c, competition win 2006)
 Faculty building, University of Copenhagen, Copenhagen (completed 2009)
 Research and educational centre, Karolinska Institute, Stockholm (competition win, completion 2011)
 Sustainable masterplan, Almere, the Netherlands
 Danish Roads and Bridges Museum, Holbæk, Denmark
 City Hall, Lund, Sweden
 Research and educational building, Technical University of Denmark, Copenhagen (competition win 2010)

References

External links
 Official website

Architecture firms of Denmark
Danish companies established in 2006
Design companies established in 2006